The Caterer is a weekly UK business magazine for hospitality professionals. It covers all areas of the hospitality industry (including restaurants, hotels, foodservice, pubs and bars) providing news, analysis and features about senior industry professionals, businesses and trends. It also includes monthly reviews of the latest hospitality products, from kitchen equipment to food and beverages.

History and profile
Caterer and Hotelkeeper (now The Caterer), first issued in 1878, was published by Reed Business Information until 2012, when it was bought by Travel Weekly Group and Jacobs Media Group owner Clive Jacobs. It employs around 30 staff and is based in Victoria, London, UK. It is published by Jacobs Media Group. As of 24 August 2020, the editor is James Stagg.

On 2 July 2014, Caterer and Hotelkeeper rebranded as The Caterer. Its coverage of the industry stayed the same but the name was changed and the website rebranded to adapt to the growing digital age.

Events and awards
The Caterer runs several events each year, including The Catey Awards, which launched in 1984. The Cateys have in the past honoured industry personalities including Gordon Ramsay, Albert Roux, Michel Roux, Marco Pierre White and Heston Blumenthal. The awards highlight those in the industry doing the best in their field, and are judged by a host of senior professionals.

In the 2022 Catey Awards, Lisa Goodwin-Allen took home Best Chef, Jeremy King won the Lifetime Achievement Award and Hélène Darroze received the International Outstanding Achievement Award.

Other awards events include:
 Hotel Cateys
 Foodservice Cateys
 UK Sommelier of the Year
 Acorn Awards
 Hotelier of the Year Award
 Product Excellence Awards
 The Caterer Summits
 Chef Eats Out
 Best Places to Work in Hospitality

The Caterer Top 100
The Caterer Top 100 is a list of the 100 most influential people in the hospitality industry. The list is compiled by industry experts who rank candidates on criteria including direct power, success, innovation, future potential and their wider influence across the industry. Previous recipients of The Caterer most influential person in the industry include Jamie Oliver and Alastair Storey.

References

External links
The Caterer
The Catey Awards
The Catey Academy: 1984-2009

Business magazines published in the United Kingdom
Weekly magazines published in the United Kingdom
Catering
Food and drink magazines
Hospitality industry in the United Kingdom
Magazines published in London
Magazines established in 1878